Fire protection is the study and practice of mitigating the unwanted effects of potentially destructive fires. It involves the study of the behaviour, compartmentalisation, suppression and investigation of fire and its related emergencies, as well as the research and development, production, testing and application of mitigating systems. In structures, be they land-based, offshore or even ships, the owners and operators are responsible to maintain their facilities in accordance with a design-basis that is rooted in laws, including the local building code and fire code, which are enforced by the authority having jurisdiction.

Buildings must be constructed in accordance with the version of the building code that is in effect when an application for a building permit is made. Building inspectors check on compliance of a building under construction with the building code. Once construction is complete, a building must be maintained in accordance with the current fire code, which is enforced by the fire prevention officers of a local fire department. In the event of fire emergencies, Firefighters, fire investigators, and other fire prevention personnel are called to mitigate, investigate and learn from the damage of a fire. Lessons learned from fires are applied to the authoring of both building codes and fire codes.

Classifying fires

When deciding on what fire protection is appropriate for any given situation, it is important to assess the types of fire hazards that may be faced.

Some jurisdictions operate systems of classifying fires using code letters. Whilst these may agree on some classifications, they also vary. Below is a table showing the standard operated in Europe and Australia against the system used in the United States.

1 Technically there is no such thing as a "Class E" fire, as electricity itself does not burn. However, it is considered a dangerous and very deadly complication to a fire, therefore using the incorrect extinguishing method can result in serious injury or death. Class E, however generally refers to fires involving electricity, therefore a bracketed E, "(E)" denoted on various types of extinguishers.

Fires are sometimes categorized as "one alarm", "two alarm", "three alarm" (or higher) fires. There is no standard definition for what this means quantifiably, though it always refers to the level response by the local authorities. In some cities, the numeric rating refers to the number of fire stations that have been summoned to the fire. In others, the number counts the number of "dispatches" for additional personnel and equipment.

Components

Fire protection in land-based buildings, offshore construction or on board ships is typically achieved via all of the following:
 Passive fire protection - the installation of firewalls and fire rated floor assemblies to form fire compartments intended to limit the spread of fire, high temperatures, and smoke.
 Active fire protection - manual and automatic detection and suppression of fires, such as fire sprinkler systems and (fire alarm) systems. 
 Education - the provision of information regarding passive and active fire protection systems to building owners, operators, occupants, and emergency personnel so that they have a working understanding of the intent of these systems and how they perform in the fire safety plan.

Balanced approach
Passive fire protection (PFP) in the form of compartmentalisation was developed prior to the invention of or widespread use of active fire protection (AFP), mainly in the form of automatic fire sprinkler systems. During this time, PFP was the dominant mode of protection provided in facility designs. With the widespread installation of fire sprinklers in the past 50 years, the reliance on PFP as the only approach was reduced.

Building operation in conformance with design
Fire protection within a structure is a system that relies on all of its components. The building is designed in compliance with the local building code and fire code by the architect and other consultants. A building permit is issued after review by the Authority Having Jurisdiction (AHJ).

Deviations from that original plan should be made known to the AHJ to make sure that the change is still in compliance with the law to prevent any unsafe conditions that may violate the law and put people at risk. For example, if the firestop systems in a structure were inoperable, a significant part of the fire safety plan might be compromised in the event of a fire because the walls and floors that contain the firestops are intended to have a fire-resistance rating. Likewise, if the sprinkler system or fire alarm system is inoperable for lack of proper maintenance, the likelihood of damage or personal injury is increased.

See also

 Fire prevention
 Automatic fire suppression
 Occupancy
 Building code
 Firefighting
 Fire test
 Listing and approval use and compliance
 Passive fire protection
 Compartmentalization
 Firestop
 Intumescent
 Endothermic
 Firestop pillow
 Fire door
 Fireproofing
 Fire-resistance rating
 Active fire protection
 External water spray system
 Fire Sprinkler
 Fire alarm
 Fire alarm system
 Fire alarm control panel
 Fire detection
 Manual call point
 False alarm
 Sprinkler Systems
 Smoke Alarm
 Hypoxic air fire prevention system
 Gaseous fire suppression
 Condensed aerosol fire suppression
 Fire protection engineering
 Flame detector
 Fire Equipment Manufacturers' Association

Notes

Further reading
 Huang, Kai. 2009. Population and Building Factors That Impact Residential Fire Rates in Large U.S. Cities. Applied Research Project. Texas State University. http://ecommons.txstate.edu/arp/287/.

External links

 National Fire Protection Association (US)
 National Fire Sprinkler Association (US)
 Fire Equipment Manufacturers' Association (US)

 
Building engineering